Maryland Dove is a re-creation of the Dove, an early 17th-century English trading ship, one of two ships (Dove and The Ark) which made up the first expedition from England to the Province of Maryland. The modern Dove was designed by the naval architect and naval historian William A. Baker. The Dove was a trading vessel that could be sailed by a crew of seven. The much larger Ark, was a passenger ship, and was sailed by a crew of 40 or more. The Dove was left behind as a local trading vessel to facilitate commerce between Maryland and the other colonies.

Maryland Dove
Launched in 1978, Maryland Dove is 56 feet in length on deck, and 76 feet overall with a displacement of 42 tons. She was built by James B. Richardson in a shipyard near Cambridge, Maryland in Dorchester County. Her home port is St. Mary's City, Maryland. The ship is owned by the State of Maryland and operated/maintained by the Historic St. Mary's City Commission. She was commissioned October 8, 1978 with Captain Thomas Doyle of Valley Lee, Maryland as her first licensed Master.  Due to deteriorating condition of the Dove a replacement ship was laid down in 2019, launched in 2022 and assumed name Maryland Dove. The 1978 Dove was hauled out of the water for preservation in 2023, the decision on its fate has not been determined.

The original The Ark and Dove
The first expedition from England to the planned colony of Maryland was undertaken by Cecilius Calvert, 2nd Baron Baltimore, (1605-1675), and consisted of two ships that had formerly belonged to his father, George Calvert, 1st Baron Baltimore, (1579-1632): The Ark and Dove. The two ships departed Gravesend, in Kent off the English Channel, with 128 settlers on board and, after being chased down and brought back by the British Royal Navy so that the departing settlers could take an oath of allegiance to the King of England as required by law, sailed in October 1633 for the Isle of Wight (between England and France) to pick up more settlers.

At the Isle of Wight, Dove and her larger sister ship The Ark embarked again with two Jesuit (Society of Jesus) priests/chaplains and nearly two hundred more settlers before setting out across the Atlantic. Since he could not lead the expedition himself, Baltimore sent detailed instructions for the governance of the Colony, including commands that his brothers seek any information about those who had earlier tried to thwart the granting of the colony and make contact with William Claiborne (previously settled from Province of Virginia on Kent Island in the middle of the Chesapeake Bay) to determine his intentions for the trading station on Kent Island. The instructions also emphasized the importance of religious toleration among the colonists, who were nearly equal parts Catholic and Protestant. With these last instructions, the expedition sailed for the Americas.

The two ships arrived at Point Comfort at the mouths of the James, Nansemond, and Elizabeth Rivers, in Virginia, February 24, 1634. On March 25, they landed at what is now St. Mary's, then the site of a Native American village, and they began the work of establishing a settlement there. The settlement of St. Mary's was built on land purchased from the native Yaocomico.

Back in England, Baltimore could do little to help the young colony through its tribulations, which included an ongoing feud with Claiborne that led to a series of naval skirmishes.

Lord Baltimore continued as Maryland's first Proprietary Governor (1632–1675), and attempted to maintain an active involvement in the governance of the colony, though he never visited it. During this long tenure, he governed through deputies, the last being his only son Charles.

In popular culture 
Maryland Dove was used extensively to represent the Mayflower in the 1979 made for TV film 'Mayflower: The Pilgrims Adventure' starring Anthony Hopkins as Captain Jones as well as Richard Crenna and Jenny Aguttar.

Notes

See also
Province of Maryland

References
 Browne, William Hand (1890). George Calvert and Cecilius Calvert: Barons Baltimore of Baltimore. New York: Dodd, Mead, and Company.

External links
Historic St. Mary's City - official website
The Dove at riverexplorer.com

1978 ships
English-American culture in Maryland
English colonization of the Americas
Exploration ships of England
Replica ships
Museums in St. Mary's County, Maryland
English emigration
Exploration ships
History of the Thirteen Colonies
Individual sailing vessels
Ships built in Maryland
Ships of England
Museum ships in Maryland
St. Mary's City, Maryland